Judicaël Perroy (born July 21, 1973, Paris) is a French classical guitarist and teacher. He won the 1997 Guitar Foundation of America International Solo Competition. Perroy is a Professor of Classical Guitar at Pôle sup' 93 Seine-Saint-Denis-Île-de-France and Lille’s apPSEA (Association de préfiguration du Pôle supérieur d’enseignements artistiques). He is also a professor at the Geneva University of Music.

Early life and education 

When Perroy was young he saw his father play the acoustic guitar. Perroy enrolled into the Paris Academy of Music (Conservatoire Municipal Inter-Arrondissements de Paris) at the age of 7 and, like the other students, started learning the foundations of classical music and the workings of his chosen instrument, the guitar. It was during these early years that he claims to have an epiphany: "All of a sudden, I understood how the instrument worked, technically." From that moment on, he says that playing the guitar became easy. In 1983, at the age of ten, he enrolled at the National School Academy of Aulnay-sous-Bois (a northeastern suburb of Paris), tutored by Delia Estrada, Roberto Aussel and later, Raymond Gratien. He was a "child prodigy". At the age of eleven he performed two Vivaldi concertos at the Theatre du Mans as a soloist, and was accompanied by a full orchestra directed by conductor Andre Girard.

Career 

A second prize placement at the International Competition of the Ile-de-France in 1988 at the age of fourteen was a start for Perroy. In 1988, he graduated summa cum laude and was awarded first prize by the Academy. He continued his studies, first privately with Pablo Márquez  then with Roberto Aussel and Daniel Lavialle. After enrolling in courses in Economics and Mathematics at university, he stopped playing the guitar for two years, from 17 to 19 years of age. He began to play again a few weeks before the 15ème Concours International de guitarre René Bartoli at the urging of Raymond Gratien and won Grand prize (awarded by the jury) as well as Audience prize (awarded by the public in attendance). Perroy went on to earn his diploma from the École Normale de Musique de Paris in 1994 after attending classes with Alberto Ponce. The same year he earned his License de Concert (1994), he competed in the 7th International Guitar Competition of Bourg-Madame, placing first by audience assignment. Two years later (1996) he was the first prize winner of the graduating class of the Conservatoire National de Musique et de Dance de Paris. He then entered the international scene by winning the prestigious Guitar Foundation of America International Solo Competition of 1997 held that year in La Jolla, California.  The prize came with a sixty-city tour of North America in 1998. Subsequently, he toured the globe both as a performer and a teacher. Many of his students had been competition winners, with three of them winning the GFA, including Thomas Viloteau.

Current academic positions 

Judicael Perroy lives in Paris. He has held the titles of Professor of Classical Guitar at the following institutions: Pôle sup' 93 Seine-Saint-Denis-Île-de-France (Aubervilliers) (2012–present); L'Association de préfiguration du Pôle Superiour d'enseignements artistiques (apPSEA) at Lille (Nord-Pas-de-Calais) (2010–present); and L'École Nationale de Musique d'Aulnay-sous-Bois (2004–2016) He was appointed as teacher at the San Francisco Conservatory from 2017 to 2021 and he is now a professor at the Haute Ecole de musique de Genève.

Judicaël Perroy's discography is varied and mostly consists of traditional classical composers (JS Bach; Mauro Giuliani; Handel; Isaac Albéniz) but also includes modern guitar repertoire (Piazzola; Gerardo Núñez; Nikita Koshkin). His transcription of Bach's second keyboard partita in C minor BWV 826, a first for the classical guitar, was released on the Naxos Records label in 2010 as part of an all Bach CD.

Discography 

Quantum (1998): Paganini; Granados; Albéniz; Dodgson.
Bayard Musique (new distribution, not reissued): Aspen Suite (2000); Albéniz; Giuliani; Barrios; Nuñez; Piazzolla; Koshkin.
Mel Bay (1999): Live Recital at Texas Tech University, Lubbock, Texas: Barrios; Piazzolla; Nuñez; Paganini; Giuliani; Bach; Albéniz.
Bayard Musique (2001): Méditation (flute and Guitar) with Florence Bellon: Anonymous; Schubert (arr. Mertz); Vivaldi; Handel; Castérède; Bach; Dowland; Giuliani; Poulenc; Debussy; Ravel.
Bayard Musique (2002): Méditation (harp and guitar) with Joanna Kozielska: Rodrigo; Pachelbel; Handel; Respighi; Debussy; Anonymous; Bach; Handel; Albinoni; Beethoven; Albéniz.
Soundset: The Well-tempered Koshkin (2000) Participation in trio with Frank Koonce and Nikita Koshkin.
Bayard Musique (2008): La Magie de la Guitare: Vivaldi; Bach; Schubert; Paganini; Albéniz; Granados; Anonymous; Rossini; Handel; Giuliani; Barrios; Piazzola; Nuñez; Koshkin.
Naxos (2010): J. S. Bach, Transcriptions for Guitar, Partita No. 2, BWV 826; Suite, BWV 997; Prelude, Fugue and Allegro, BWV 998; Concerto, BWV 972.
Naxos (2014): M.M Ponce, Guitar Music, Vol. 4, Sonatina Meridional; Thème varié et finale (Version 2) [Ed. A. Segovia] 
Diferencias Sobre la Folía de España y Fuga; Variaciónes Sobre un Tema de A. de Cabezón; Thème varié et finale (Version 1); Guitar Sonata No. 2: Andante

Contrastes Records (2017): Paris Une Solitude Peuplée: Villa Lobos; Scriabin; M.M Ponce; Takemitsu ; Sor

References 

French classical guitarists
French male guitarists
1973 births
Living people
Musicians from Paris
Conservatoire de Paris alumni
École Normale de Musique de Paris alumni
21st-century guitarists
21st-century French male musicians